The 1954–55 Princeton Tigers men's basketball team represented Princeton University in intercollegiate college basketball during the 1954–55 NCAA men's basketball season. The head coach was Franklin Cappon and the team captain was Harold "Bud" Haabestad, Jr. The team played its home games in the Dillon Gymnasium on the university campus in Princeton, New Jersey.  The team was the winner of the Eastern Intercollegiate Basketball League.

The team posted a 13–12 overall record and an 11–4 conference record. During the season, the team lost seven of its first eight games.

During the season, Haabestad established numerous Princeton scoring standards, including being the first Tiger basketball player to score 500 points in a season and 1000 in a career. Peter C. Campbell broke several of his records.  Campbell broke the following records during the 1959–60 season: single-season points (500) and single-season points per game (20.0). He broke the following records during the 1961–62 season: career points (1292), career points per game (18.2), career field goals made (458) and career free throws made (376).  Haabestad's career free throws made record surpassed Arthur Loeb's records of 342 set during the 1924–25 season.

References

Princeton Tigers men's basketball seasons
Princeton Tigers
Princeton
Prince
Prince